The black-faced pitta (Pitta anerythra) is a species of bird in the family Pittidae. It is found on Bougainville Island in Papua New Guinea (subspecies pallida), and Choiseul Island (subspecies nigrifrons) as well as Santa Isabel Island (nominate form) in the Solomon Islands.  Its natural habitat is subtropical or tropical moist lowland forest. It is threatened by habitat loss and most certainly by introduced predators and/or competitors.

References

External links
BirdLife Species Factsheet.

black-faced pitta
Birds of Bougainville Island
Birds of the Solomon Islands
black-faced pitta
Taxonomy articles created by Polbot